Luan Cândido de Almeida (born 2 February 2001) is a Brazilian footballer who plays as a left-back for Red Bull Bragantino. He was included in The Guardian's "Next Generation 2018".

Club career
In January 2022, Cândido joined Red Bull Bragantino on a permanent deal after spending two years on loan at the club.

Career statistics

Club

Notes

References

2001 births
Living people
Brazilian footballers
Brazil youth international footballers
Brazilian expatriate footballers
Association football defenders
Campeonato Brasileiro Série A players
Sociedade Esportiva Palmeiras players
RB Leipzig players
Red Bull Bragantino players
Brazilian expatriate sportspeople in Germany
Expatriate footballers in Germany